mercy is the eleventh album by Meredith Monk, released on October 29, 2002, through ECM New Series.

Track listing

Personnel 
Musicians
Allison Easter – vocals (1)
Theo Bleckmann – vocals (1-4, 6, 8, 9, 11-14)
Katie Geissinger – vocals (1-4, 8, 9, 11-14)
Ching Gonzalez – vocals (1-4, 8, 9, 11-14)
Bohdan Hilash – A clarinet (1), soprano clarinet (1, 10), bass clarinet (9, 13), E♭ clarinet (13), contrabass clarinet (13)
John Hollenbeck – bells (1, 9), xylophone (1, 11), vibraphone (1, 6, 12, 13), marimba (1, 2, 6, 13, 11, 14), piano (3), vocals (4), cymbals (5, 7, 9), melodica (8, 10), percussion (9), cowbell (11), gong (11), bass drum (13), percussion (13), triangle (13)
Meredith Monk – vocals (1, 2, 4, 6, 8-14), production
Allison Sniffin – viola (1), vocals (1, 2, 4, 8, 12, 13), piano (1, 6, 8-11, 14), synthesizer (3), violin (7)
Production
Tom Bogdan – production
Ann Hamilton – cover art
Ulrike Körner – design
Scott Lehrer – engineering, mixing
Dieter Rehm – design

References 

2002 albums
ECM New Series albums
Meredith Monk albums